Eremophila veneta, commonly known as metallic-flowered eremophila is a flowering plant in the figwort family, Scrophulariaceae and is endemic to Western Australia. It is a low, spreading, sticky shrub with dark green leaves and bluish-green petals.

Description
It is sticky, due to the presence of resin on its branches, leaves and sepals. Its branches are covered with small raised, resin glands and the resin dries yellow and eventually becomes flaky.

The petal tube is metallic bluish-green to bluish purple on the top and pale yellow below. The inner and outer surfaces of the petal tubes and lobes are covered with glandular hairs. The 4 stamens extend beyond the end of the petal tube.

Taxonomy and naming 
The species was first formally described by Robert Chinnock in 2007 and the description was published in Eremophila and Allied Genera: A Monograph of the Plant Family Myoporaceae.

Distribution and habitat 
This eremophila is only found in a few locations between Gnowangerup and Hyden in the Avon Wheatbelt and Mallee biogeographic regions where it grows in clay or sandy soils on plains and flats.

Conservation
Eremophila veneta is classified as "Priority Four" by the Western Australian Government Department of Parks and Wildlife, meaning that is rare or near threatened.

Use in horticulture
This low, spreading eremophila is a hardy shrub with unusual bluish-green, bird-attracting flowers. It can be propagated from cuttings and grown in alkaline or clay-based soil in full sun or partial shade. It is drought and frost tolerant and only requires an occasional watering during a long dry spell.

References

Eudicots of Western Australia
veneta
Endemic flora of Western Australia
Plants described in 2007
Taxa named by Robert Chinnock